The National Federation of Music Clubs (NFMC) is an American non-profit philanthropic music organization that promotes American music, performers, and composers.  NFMC endeavors to strengthen quality music education by supporting "high standards of musical creativity and performance." NFMC headquarters are located in Greenwood, Indiana.

History 
The National Federation of Music Clubs was founded in 1898 and became an NGO member of the United Nations in 1949. It was chartered by the U.S. Congress in 1982.

Early timeline 
 
 1897: A temporary organizational committee was formed.
 
 1899: The First biennial Convention was held in St. Louis, May 3–6, 1899. Alice Uhl was re-elected president.
 1901: Biennial Convention was held in Cleveland, April 30 to May 3, 1901; international music relations was stressed. First recorded Junior Club, sponsored by the Beethoven Club of Memphis, Tennessee.
 1903: Biennial Convention was held in Rochester, New York.
 1915: Beginning of Youth Artist Auditions, which became integral to the NFMC.
 1916: The first state federation organization, affiliated with NFMC, was formed in Wisconsin.  That same year, Michigan formed one.

Mission and services 
NFMC provides opportunities for musical study, performance and appreciation to more than 120,000 senior, student and junior members in 6,500 music-related clubs and organizations nationwide. Members are professional and amateur musicians, vocalists, composers, dancers, performing artists, arts and music educators, music students, generous music patrons and benefactors, and music lovers of all ages.

Dedicated to finding and fostering young musical talent, the NFMC conducts annual Junior Festivals with more than 117,000 participants. NFMC offers more than three quarters of a million dollars in state and national competitions (see competitions), including four $20,000 biennial Young Artist awards, and the $20,000 Ellis Award for Duo-Pianists. The Young Artist and Ellis Duo Piano awards include two years of performance bookings.

Federation members work to create a dynamic musical and cultural environment in their communities through education and sponsorship of musical events. The Federation champions American music with awards and commissions. Federated States proclaim November American Music Month, in which the annual Parade of American Music focuses on programs of music by American composers. Awards are given annually to recognize educational institutions for their promotion and presentation of American music.

Other areas of Federation interest include:

 Sponsoring of National Music Week, the first week of May each year
 Support for legislation on bills affecting the welfare of musicians, music education and development of American musical life
 Sponsors musical therapy programs in hospitals, nursing homes and prisons
 Provides opportunities for study and performance to musicians with disabilities and visual impairments
 Works with affiliated music and arts departments in hundreds of universities and colleges
 Promotes community awareness, support and involvement in the performing arts including opera, dance and poetry
 Campaigns for higher standards in church, radio and television music
 Encourages songs of our heritage through a Together We Sing program
 Aids and encourages music education in schools, public and private
 Recognizes and promotes outstanding American music and composers annually through programs such as American Music Month (November), Parade of American Music, Celebrate Strings (Previously named "Crusade for Strings"), Music Outreach, and the Emil and Ruth Beyer Composition Awards.  With annual prize money totaling $11,000, the Beyer Awards are among the most significant awards given to young composers in the United States.  Past winners include Eric Lindsay, Charlie Peck, Carl Schimmel, and Mischa Zupko.

Leadership 

 
 1901–1903: Mrs. Curtis Webster
 1903–1905: Mrs. Winifred B. Collins
 1905: Mrs. Russell Ripley Dorr (née Sarah Louisa Bryan; 1852–1938)
 1905–1907: Mrs. Julius Eugene Kinney
 1907–1911: Mrs. Charles B. Kelsey
 1911–1915: Mrs. Julius Eugene Kinney
 1915–1919: Mrs. Albert J. Ochsner
 1919–1921: Mrs. Frank A. Seiberling
 1921–1925: Mrs. John F. Lyons
 1925–1929: Mrs. Edgar Stillman Kelley
 1929–1933: Mrs. Elmer James Ottoway
 1933–1937: Mrs. John Alexander Jardine
 1937–1941: Mrs. Vincent Hilles Ober (Julia Fuqua Ober)
 1941–1947: Mrs. Guy Patterson Gannett
 1947–1951: Mrs. Royden James Keith (1886–1965)
 1951–1955: Mrs. Ada Holding Miller
 1955–1959: Mrs. Ronald Arthur Dougan
 1959–1963: Mrs. C. Arthur Bullock
 1963–1967: Mrs. Clifton J. Muir
 1967–1971: Mrs. Maurice Honigman
 1971–1975: Dr. Merle Montgomery
 1975–1979: Mrs. Frank A. Vought
 1979–1983: Mrs. Jack Christopher Ward
 1983–1987: Mrs. Dwight De Losse Smith Robinson
 1987–1991: Mrs. Glenn L. Brown
 1991–1995: Virginia F. Allison (Mrs. D. Clifford)
 1995–1999: Dr. Barbara M. Irish
 1999–2003: Dr. Ouida Keck
 2003–2007: Elizabeth Paris
 2007–2011: Lana M. Bailey
 2011–2015: Carolyn C Nelson
 2015–2019: Michael Edwards
 2019–present: Frances Nelson

State Organizations 
There are 45 State Federations with more than 120,000 Senior, Student/Collegiate, and Junior members in 5,000 federated clubs and organizations. Federated states are divided into five regions:  Northeastern, Southeastern, North Central, South Central, and Western.

Conventions/Fall Sessions 
NFMC biennial conventions are held in the even years; Conferences are held biennially in the odd years.

Publications 
 Music Clubs (magazine), published 3 times a year.
 Junior Keynotes (magazine), published 3 times a year.

Notable Members 
 Olivia Dudley Bucknam, first vice-president of the California Federation of Music Clubs and Cadman Creative Club
 Abigail Keasey Frankel, for eight years a member of National Federation of Music Clubs as Librarian, Secretary, and First Vice-president
 Laura E. Frenger, in 1928 elected President of the State Federation of Music Clubs
 Abbie Norton Jamison, composer, president of the California Federation of Music Clubs
 Bell T. Ritchie, President of the California Federation of Music Clubs, which Bessie Bartlett Frankel helped to found
Josephine Trott, upon her death in 1950 bequeathed the royalties from her books and music to the National Federation of Music Clubs to fund the Josephine Trott Memorial Scholarship Fund
Constance Walton - composer, won the National Federation of Music Clubs Adult Composer Award in 1977 
Bessie Marshall Whitely - composer, whose opera Hiawatha's Childhood won the National Federation of Music Clubs award in 1912  
Mary Wiggins - composer and educator, who received an award from the National Federation of Music Clubs in 1973
Glad Robinson Youse - the National Federation of Music Clubs sponsors the biennial Glad Robinson Youse Adult Composers Contest

Notes and references

Biographical note

Inline citations

External links 
 National Federation of Music Clubs – official site

Music organizations based in the United States
Organizations based in Indiana
Arts organizations established in 1898
Patriotic and national organizations chartered by the United States Congress